The Elias Van Bunschooten House is located in Wantage Township, Sussex County, New Jersey, United States. The house was built in 1790 and was added to the National Register of Historic Places on November 1, 1974.

See also 
 National Register of Historic Places listings in Sussex County, New Jersey

References

External links
 Van Bunschooten Museum - Chinkchewunska Chapter of the Daughters of the American Revolution

Houses completed in 1790
Houses on the National Register of Historic Places in New Jersey
Houses in Sussex County, New Jersey
Museums in Sussex County, New Jersey
Historic house museums in New Jersey
National Register of Historic Places in Sussex County, New Jersey
Wantage Township, New Jersey
New Jersey Register of Historic Places